Birkbeck Fells is a township located in part of the parishes of Crosby Ravensworth, Orton and Shap in the historic county of Westmorland. It is a large mountainous district, and was described in the mid nineteenth century as containing around thirty scattered houses.

A map of 1858 shows that at the time Birkbeck Fells consisted of several detached parts to the north of Brethedrale and west of the hamlet of Greenholme, together with the undivided moor of Birkbeck Fells Common

It is notable for being the birth-place of Nicholas Close whom Henry VI of England appointed to oversee the construction of King's College Chapel, Cambridge.

References

Notes

External links
 Birkbeck Fells on A Vision of Britain Through Time
 Birkbeck Fells Common on Ordnace Survey #GetOutside

Westmorland